Alfred Dobson may refer to:
 Alfred Dobson (footballer)
 Alfred Dobson (politician)